Melanie Laine is a country music singer from Saskatoon, Saskatchewan, Canada, best known for her cover of Juice Newton's "Queen Of Hearts." Her first album, Time Flies, was released in 2005.

Discography

Albums

Singles

Music videos

References

External links
Official Site
Biography at countrymusicnews.ca

1975 births
Canadian women country singers
Living people
Musicians from Saskatoon
21st-century Canadian women singers